The  New York Giants season was the franchise's inaugural season in the National Football League. The team finished with a record of 8–4 against league opponents.

Schedule

 Games in italics are against non-NFL teams.

Game Summaries

NFL contests only; summaries for games against non-league teams are unavailable.

Week 4: at Providence Steam Roller

Week 5, Game 1: at Frankford Yellow Jackets

Week 5, Game 2: vs. Frankford Yellow Jackets

Week 7: vs. Cleveland Bulldogs

Week 8, Game 1: vs. Buffalo Bisons

Week 8, Game 2: vs. Columbus Tigers

Week 9, Game 1: vs. Rochester Jeffersons

Week 9, Game 2: vs. Providence Steam Roller

Week 10: vs. Kansas City Cowboys

Week 11: vs. Dayton Triangles

Week 12: vs. Chicago Bears

Week 13: at Chicago Bears

Standings

See also
List of New York Giants seasons

External links
 1925 New York Giants season at Pro Football Reference
 Pro Football Archives: 1925 New York Giants (NFL)
 Autographs of the players from the 1925 New York Giants

New York Giants seasons
New York Giants
New York
1920s in Manhattan
Washington Heights, Manhattan